Keisen may refer to:
 Keisen University
 Keisen, Fukuoka
 Keisen Station